Bayramlı (also, Bayramly) is a village and municipality in the Tovuz Rayon of Azerbaijan.  It has a population of 2,473.

References 

Populated places in Tovuz District